Tympanocryptis rustica, the Tennant Creek pebble dragon, is a species of agama found in the Northern Territory of Australia.

References

rustica
Endemic fauna of Australia
Reptiles of the Northern Territory
Agamid lizards of Australia
Taxa named by Jane Melville
Taxa named by Mark Norman Hutchinson
Reptiles described in 2019